AB1 is a French television channel.

AB1 may also refer to:

 Bernard AB 1, a French biplane
 Aichi AB-1, a Japanese biplane
 Class-AB1 amplifier, a type of power amplifier
 AB1 in the AB postcode area
 AB1, the Athens Biennale in 2007
 , a crane ship